Tom or Tommy Dixon may refer to:
Tom Dixon (American football) (born 1961), American football player
Tom Dixon (catcher) (1906–1982), Negro league baseball catcher 
Tom Dixon (pitcher) (born 1955), Major League Baseball pitcher
Tom Dixon (Canadian football) (born 1960), kicker in the Canadian Football League
Tom Dixon (hurler) (1930–2003), Irish hurler
Tom Dixon (industrial designer) (born 1959), British designer
Tommy Dixon (footballer, born 1929) (1929–2014), English footballer
Tommy Dixon (footballer, born 1882) (1882–1941), English footballer
Tommy Dixon (footballer, born 1899) (1899–?), English footballer

See also
Thomas Dixon (disambiguation)